Beyond Any Form (lit. I am neither Angel nor Devil) is a collaborative studio album by Persian traditional musicians Homayoun Shajarian and Tahmoures Pournazeri, as vocalist and composer respectively.

The album was unveiled on March 11, 2014, in a ceremony held in Vahdat Hall.

Beyond Any Form includes eight songs in Persian language based on lyrics from renowned Persian classical poet Mowlana Jalaleddin Rumi and contemporary poets Shafiei Kadkani, Simin Behbahani and Hossein Monzavi.

Composer Tahmoures Pournazeri describes the album as an "Iranian contemporary music" album, lacking Radif and inspired by classical, Tanbur, Flamenco and Kurdish music.

The 5th track, is based on a melody from Paco de Lucía and the 7th track is played improvisationally.

The album also features American composer David K. Garner, Indian Sitar virtuoso Shujaat Khan, Venezuelan flautist Pedro Eustache and American blues guitarist Jimmy Johnson.

Beyond Any Form was among the best-selling albums in Iran.

A music video of Why Did You Leave Me? was directed by Baran Kosari for the unveiling ceremony, featuring a number of Iranian actors, including Sahar Dolatshahi, Navid Mohammadzadeh and Mehrdad Sedighian among others.

Track listing

Personnel 
Credits are adapted from Beyond Any Form liner notes.

 Homayoun Shajarian – vocals
 Tahmoures Pournazeri – composer, recording supervisor, photographer, setar (track 1-5, 7-8), barbat (track 3, 6), daf (track 3)
Additional musicians
 David Garner – arrangement
 Ramón Stagnaro – guitar (track 8)
 Sohrab Pournazeri – kamancheh (track 3, 6, 8)
 Jimmy Johnson – bass (track 5, 8)
 Shujaat Khan – sitar (track 6)
 Pedro Eustache – duduk (track 6)
 Hamidreza Taghavi – santour (track 8)
 John Wakefield – percussion (track 5-8)
 Shahab Paranj – kouzeh & kick (track 8)
 Mehmet Akatai – darbuka, bendir (track 3)
 Mahyar Torayhi – santour (track 3)
 Kaveh Grayeli – setar (track 3)

 Philip Brezina – violin (track 1, 6)
 Stephanie Bibbu – violin (track 1, 6)
 David Ryther – violin (track 1, 6)
 Peter Masek – violin (track 1, 6)
 Jory Fankuchen – violin (track 1, 6)
 Natalie Carducci – violin (track 1, 6)
 Noemy Lafrenais – violin (track 1, 6)
 Evan Buttemer – viola (track 1)
 Nils Bultman – viola (track 1)
 Cilo Tilton – viola (track 1)
 Elizabeth Chio – viola (track 1)
 Andrei Gorbatenko – bass (track 1)
 Alden Cohen – bass (track 1)
 Seth Osborn – piano (track 1)
 Roshanak Kaymanesh – chor (track 1)
 Samira Mohseni – chor (track 1)
 Shuin Corrasco – cello (track 1, 6)
 Joanne De Mars – cello (track 1, 6)

Artistic personnel
 Pouneh Mirlou – graphic design and illustration
 Neda Moradi – illustrator
 Arash Gharighi – photographer
 Behrouz Badiei – photographer
 Hananeh Tabatabaei – photographer
 Soroush Payandeh – photographer
Technical personnel
 Sadroddin Hosseinkhani – producer 
 Mehdi Beshkoufeh – associate producer 
 Adam Monuz – sound engineer
 Jesse Nichols – sound engineer
 Alberto Hernandez – sound engineer
 Jill Tengan – sound engineer
 Omid Nikbin – sound engineer
 Reza Sadeghi – mixing

References

External links 
 Beyond Any Form at Amazon.com

2014 albums
Classical albums by Iranian artists
World music albums by Iranian artists
Contemporary classical music albums
Collaborative albums